Pipeclay is a national park in Queensland, Australia, 165 km north of Brisbane.

See also

 Protected areas of Queensland

References 

National parks of Queensland
Protected areas established in 1963
Wide Bay–Burnett